Laurie Jean Walters Slade is a retired American actress, best known for playing Joanie Bradford on Eight Is Enough which aired from 1977 until 1981 on ABC.

Career
Walters was born in San Francisco, California, to Elsie and Laurie Walters. The family attended First United Presbyterian Church located at 1740 Sloat Boulevard in San Francisco.  Walters was, by several years, the oldest of the eight actors playing the Bradford children, though her character, Joanie Bradford, was the third-oldest child in the family. Walters is six months older than Betty Buckley (born July 3, 1947), who played her character's stepmother. Walters' first screen role was as Sheila Grove in 1973's The Harrad Experiment. 

Walters made guest appearances on a number of other television series through the 1980s, such as Cheers and Highway to Heaven, as well as on two Eight Is Enough reunion specials, but she has not acted on television since 1993.

Walters has acted in plays in the Southern California area and directed theater productions in Ojai, California, under her married name, Laurie Walters Slade. Walters was later in charge of film acquisitions for a subscription-based film service called Ironweed Films.

Filmography

Film

Television

References

External links
 

Actresses from San Francisco
Living people
American film actresses
American television actresses
Jewish American actresses
21st-century American women
Year of birth missing (living people)